Caley Picture House was a cinema and concert venue located in Edinburgh, Scotland.

History
The auditorium, which opened in 1923, originally seated 900, and was later increased to 1,900 in 1928. The cinema was closed in 1984 and was converted into a discothèque in 1986. Notable past performers include Robin Trower, Wishbone Ash, Uriah Heep, Hawkwind, Rory Gallagher, Queen, Beck, Bogert & Appice, Gentle Giant and AC/DC.

The building became a Wetherspoons pub in 2016.

References

Former cinemas in Scotland